Brimeura duvigneaudii is a species of plant that is endemic to Spain.  Its natural habitats are Mediterranean matorral shrubland,  and above rocky shores.

References

Scilloideae
Endemic flora of Spain
Matorral shrubland
Critically endangered plants
Critically endangered biota of Europe
Taxonomy articles created by Polbot